Mizusawa Dam is a rockfill dam located in Akita Prefecture in Japan. The dam is used for flood control and irrigation. The catchment area of the dam is 27 km2. The dam impounds about 24  ha of land when full and can store 3001 thousand cubic meters of water. The construction of the dam was started on 1975 and completed in 1994.

References

Dams in Akita Prefecture
1994 establishments in Japan